The 2020 Dubai Tennis Championships (also known as the Dubai Duty Free Tennis Championships for sponsorship reasons) was an ATP Tour 500 event on the 2020 ATP Tour and a Premier tournament on the 2020 WTA Tour. Both events were held at the Aviation Club Tennis Centre in Dubai, United Arab Emirates. The women's tournament took place from February 17 to 22 and the men's tournament from February 24 to 29.

The Women's event was expanded to 30 places in the main draw, and 48 places in qualifying; following the cancellation of the Hungarian Ladies Open, which was scheduled in the same week as the Dubai Tennis Championships.

Points

Point distribution

ATP singles main-draw entrants

Seeds 

 Rankings are as of February 17, 2020.

Other entrants 
The following players received wildcards into the singles main draw:
  Prajnesh Gunneswaran
  Malek Jaziri
  Mohamed Safwat

The following player received entry using a protected ranking into the singles main draw:
  Lu Yen-hsun

The following players received entry from the qualifying draw:
  Lloyd Harris
  Lorenzo Musetti
  Dennis Novak 
  Yasutaka Uchiyama

Withdrawals 
Before the tournament
  Roger Federer → replaced by  Yoshihito Nishioka
  Jo-Wilfried Tsonga → replaced by  Ričardas Berankis

ATP doubles main-draw entrants

Seeds 

 Rankings are as of February 17, 2020.

Other entrants
The following pairs received wildcards into the doubles main draw:
  Abdulrahman Al Janahi /  Fares Al Janahi
  Matthew Ebden /  Leander Paes

The following pair received entry from the qualifying draw:
  Henri Kontinen /  Jan-Lennard Struff

WTA singles main-draw entrants

Seeds 

 Rankings are as of February 10, 2020.

Other entrants
The following players received wildcards into the singles main draw:
  Kim Clijsters
  Ons Jabeur
  Garbiñe Muguruza
  Elina Svitolina

The following player received entry as a special exempt:
  Elena Rybakina

The following players received entry from the qualifying draw:
  Jennifer Brady
  Sorana Cîrstea
  Veronika Kudermetova 
  Kristina Mladenovic
  Aliaksandra Sasnovich
  Kateřina Siniaková

The following player received entry as a lucky loser:
  Hsieh Su-wei

Withdrawals 
Before the tournament
  Bianca Andreescu → replaced by  Anastasia Pavlyuchenkova
  Ashleigh Barty → replaced by  Wang Qiang
  Kiki Bertens → replaced by  Hsieh Su-wei
  Madison Keys → replaced by  Barbora Strýcová
  Johanna Konta → replaced by  Anastasija Sevastova

WTA doubles main-draw entrants

Seeds 

 Rankings are as of February 10, 2020.

Other entrants
The following pairs received a wildcard into the doubles main draw:
  Monique Adamczak /  Yana Sizikova
  Caroline Garcia /  Sania Mirza

Withdrawals
 During the tournament
  Markéta Vondroušová (right adductor strain)

Champions

Men's singles

  Novak Djokovic def.  Stefanos Tsitsipas, 6–3, 6–4

Women's singles

  Simona Halep def.  Elena Rybakina, 3–6, 6–3, 7–6(7–5)

Men's doubles

  John Peers /  Michael Venus def.  Raven Klaasen /  Oliver Marach, 6–3, 6–2

Women's doubles

  Hsieh Su-wei /  Barbora Strýcová def.  Barbora Krejčiková /  Zheng Saisai, 7–5, 3–6, [10–5]

References

External links
 Official website

 
2020
2020 ATP Tour
2020 WTA Tour
2020 in Emirati tennis
February 2020 sports events in Asia